El Cuero is the eponymous debut studio album by Norwegian rock group El Cuero, released on 15 August 2007.

Track listing 
All music and lyrics by Brynjar Takle Ohr unless stated otherwise.

 Is This Over - 6:58 (Brynjar & Håvard Takle Ohr)
 I Hate Myself (For Loving You) - 3:50 (Øyvind Blomstrøm & Brynjar Takle Ohr)
 My Roving Eye - 3:58
 When I Slip Away - 5:05 
 Did I Know You - 12:22
 Did You See Them - 4:16
 Hate Will Get Us Nowhere - 3:34
 If You'll Follow - 5:07
 Ain't It Hard - 4:20 
 Little Bird - 7:25

Personnel

El Cuero
 Brynjar Takle Ohr - lead vocals, guitars, piano on "When The Lights Go Out"
 Tommy Reite - bass guitar
 Håvard Takle Ohr - drums, backing vocals
 Øyvind Blomstrøm - lead guitars, pedal steel, piano and backing vocals

Additional musicians
 Ingrid Olava - vocals on "I Hate Myself (For Loving You)"
 Inge Svegge - hammond organ

References
 Album liner notes and booklet.

El Cuero albums
2007 albums